Robin Fox may refer to

Robin Fox (born 1934), an Anglo-American anthropologist 
Robin Lane Fox (born 1946), an English historian
Robin Fox (theatrical agent) (1913–1971), an English actor and theatrical agent
Robin C. Fox (born 1976), an English producer
Robin Fox (Australian musician) (born 1973), an Australian musician